Cătălina may refer to several villages in Romania:

 Cătălina, a village in Panticeu Commune, Cluj County
 Cătălina, a village in Coltău Commune, Maramureș County

See also
 Catalina, a commune in Covasna County
 Cătălin (disambiguation) for individuals named Cătălina